Bajana is a village in Dasada Taluka of Surendranagar district, Gujarat, India.

Location
Bajana is situated on the southern shore of the Little Rann of Kutch near its south-east corner. It lies in north latitude 23° 6' and east longitude 71° 49'.

History 
These Jats, originally inhabitants of Baluchistan and Makran, are said to have come in 711 with the army of Muhammad Qasim, and settled at Vanga in Sindh. It is said that a Sindh ruler sought to force into his harem two of Malik Umar Khan's daughters, and that the Jats resisting were attacked and forced to fly to Dadhana state. Finding no shelter, they fled to Kathiawar where the Parmars of Muli helped them. 
Muslik-Mahmud I Begadha, Sultan of Gujarat, employed the Jats in the siege of Champaner (Chhota Udepur) in 1484, and granted the state of Bajana with 24 villages to their leader Hadoji. The Jats subsequently conquered Mandal in Viramgam Taluqa from the Jhalas. They were allowed to retain several of its villages, although Mandal itself was taken by the Sultan. When the Sardar of Bajana incurred the displeasure of the Mughal viceroy of Gujarat, the latter resumed the grant of the Estate and ordered it partitioned among Jat Maleks. Bajana was assigned to Hadoji (Haidar Khan), Valivada to Isaji. Isaji later conquered Warahi. Warahi was known as the senior Jatwad, and Bajana as the Junior Jatwad.

From 1921 to 1947 the ruler was entitled to elect a representative member of the Chamber of Princes. In 1948 his Privy Purse was set at Rs 65,500 a year.

At the time of merger, the area of the State was 183 square miles, and the population (1941) 13,996. From 1943 to 1947 Bajana was attached to Baroda. Bajana is now in Surendranagar District.

References

 This article incorporates text from a publication now in the public domain: 

Cities and towns in Surendranagar district